Ash Hill, or Hitching Post Hill, is a two-story brick dwelling erected ca. 1840, and located on Rosemary Lane, in Hyattsville, Prince George's County, Maryland. The house was built by Robert Clark, an Englishman who was seeking space and quiet in contrast to the crowded city of Washington, D.C. In 1875, General Edward Fitzgerald Beale bought the property. Beale was well connected and known to have entertained President U.S. Grant (a close personal friend who kept his two Arabian horses, Leopard and Linden, stabled at Ash Hill), President Grover Cleveland and Buffalo Bill Cody. The house, with its foot-thick brick walls and hilltop site, is an imposing one, made even more so by the massive pillared porch which surrounds it on three sides. The porch was added by Admiral Chauncey Thomas who purchased the property in 1895.

It was listed on the National Register of Historic Places in 1977.

References

External links

, including photo in 2003, at Maryland Historical Trust website

Houses in Prince George's County, Maryland
Hyattsville, Maryland
Houses completed in 1840
Houses on the National Register of Historic Places in Maryland
National Register of Historic Places in Prince George's County, Maryland
Historic American Buildings Survey in Maryland